Shine is Estelle's second studio album. It was released on September 23, 2008 supported by the lead single "Wait a Minute (Just a Touch)", released in November 2007.

The second single, "American Boy" featuring Kanye West, reached number 1 on the UK Singles Chart and the top 10 in several other countries. It also garnered two Grammy Award nominations for Best Rap Sung Collaboration and Song of the Year.

Along with Kanye West on "American Boy", the album features will.i.am, Kardinal Offishall, Mark Ronson, John Legend and Cee-Lo. A bonus track by Hi-Tek includes "Life to Me" featuring Estelle as a guest artist.

A version of the album with additional bonus tracks and videos was made available through iTunes. The two bonus tracks are "Life to Me" (also on the UK CD single for "American Boy") and "I Wanna Live", plus the videos for "American Boy" and "Wait a Minute (Just a Touch)". Shine was nominated for the Barclaycard Mercury Prize in 2008.

History
The album features Kanye West, will.i.am, Kardinal Offishall, Mark Ronson, John Legend and Cee-Lo. The song "Life to Me" by Hi-Tek featuring Estelle as a guest artist was included on some editions as a bonus track. Shine debuted at number 38 on the Billboard 200 chart, selling 14,800 copies in its first week and number 6 on the Top R&B/Hip Hop Albums chart. "Magnificent" was featured in the 2008 film 21, and the single "Pretty Please (Love Me)" was featured in the top-grossing romantic comedy Sex and the City: The Movie, and it is included on the second soundtrack of the film.

Track listing
Credits adapted from the liner notes.

Singles chronology
United Kingdom
 "Wait a Minute (Just a Touch)"
 "American Boy"
 "No Substitute Love"
 "Pretty Please (Love Me)"
 "Come Over" (Remix)

Europe and Australia
 "American Boy"
 "No Substitute Love"
 "Come Over" (Remix)

North America
 "American Boy"
 "Come Over" (Remix)

Charts

Weekly charts

Year-end charts

Release history

References

External links
Billboard chart
Estelle in-depth interview by Pete Lewis, 'Blues & Soul' March 2008
CBS News
Voice-Online

Estelle (musician) albums
2008 albums
Albums produced by Jack Splash
Albums produced by John Legend
Albums produced by Mark Ronson
Albums produced by Supa Dups
Albums produced by Swizz Beatz
Albums produced by will.i.am
Atlantic Records albums